Augusta is a neighborhood in Pike Township, Marion County, in the U.S. state of Indiana. It was formerly a small village that later had a post office and general stores.

History
Augusta was settled when the Michigan Road was completed. It became a thriving community with a general store and other commercial buildings. Eventually much of the Augusta business community moved to be near the railroad station in what is now New Augusta.

Geography
Augusta is located just south of Crooked Creek at the intersection of 76th St. and Michigan Rd. in Indianapolis.

See also
 New Augusta Historic District

References

Neighborhoods in Indianapolis
Former villages in the United States